The 9K34 Strela-3 ('arrow', NATO reporting name: SA-14 Gremlin) is a man-portable air defense missile system (MANPADS) developed in the Soviet Union as a response to the poor performance of the earlier 9K32 Strela-2 (SA-7 Grail) system. The missile was largely based on the earlier Strela 2, and thus development proceeded rapidly. The new weapon was accepted into service in the Soviet Army in January 1974.

Description
The most significant change over the Strela 2 was the introduction of an all-new infra-red homing seeker head. The new seeker worked on FM modulation (con-scan) principle, which is less vulnerable to jamming and decoy flares than the earlier AM (spin-scan) seekers, which were easily fooled by flares and even the most primitive infrared jammers. The new seeker also introduced detector element cooling in the form of a pressurized nitrogen bottle attached to the launcher.

The effect of cooling was to expand the seeker's lead sulphide detector element's sensitivity range to longer wavelengths (slightly over 4 μm as opposed to 2.8 μm of uncooled PbS elements). In practice this made possible the tracking of cooler targets over longer ranges, and enabled forward-hemisphere engagement of jets under favourable circumstances. The seeker also had better tracking rate, enabling the missile to track maneuvering of fast and approaching targets.

A negative side effect from the aforementioned improvements was increased missile weight, which caused a slight decrease in the kinematic performance of the original Strela-2 (SA-7).  Against relatively slow, low-altitude battlefield air threats the overall effectiveness was much improved.

Strela-3 missiles have been exported to over 30 countries.

The original Strela-3 missile was the 9M36. The follow-on to the Strela-3 was Igla.

The naval version of this missile has the NATO reporting name of SA-N-8.

Operational history

Iraq
On 22 November 2003 an Airbus A300 cargo plane was hit by a Strela-3 missile after takeoff from Baghdad International Airport, but managed to land safely despite losing hydraulic power.

On 6 May 2006, a British Westland Lynx AH.7 of the Royal Navy from 847 Squadron was shot down with a Strela-3 over Basra, killing five crewmen and crashing into a house.

Georgia
During the War in Abkhazia (1992–1993), a Russian Mi-8 helicopter was shot down by a Georgian Army SA-14 on December 14, 1992, resulting in the death of 3 crew and 58 passengers, most of them Russian refugees. A Georgian Air Force Su-25 was shot down over Nizhnaya Eshera on 4 July 1993 by SA-14, and several other aircraft on both sides may have been shot down by SA-14s.

Former Yugoslavia
A British Sea Harrier FRS1 of 801 Naval Air Squadron, operating from aircraft carrier  on 16 April 1994, was shot down during its attack on two Serbian T-55 tanks in Bosnia. The pilot, Lieutenant Nick Richardson, ejected and landed in territory controlled by friendly Bosniaks.

DRC Congo
A Zimbabwe Air Force Il-76 was shot down by Congolese rebels using an SA-14 on 11 October 1998 during the Second Congo War, resulting in the death of 40 troops and crew.

Afghanistan
SA-14s used by the Northern Alliance are credited with having shot down 8 Taliban MiG-21 and Su-22 fighters during the Taliban's 2000 offensive against Taloqan.

Turkey 
A SA-14 (9K34 Strela-3) MANPADS was found during Operation Claw (2019-2020) in June 2019 in the Hakurk region of northern Iraq belonging to the PKK.

Operators

Current operators

 
  Jamiat-e Islami
 
  UNITA
 
  
 
 
 
  – used during Georgian civil war.
  Hezbollah
 
 
 
  Kurdistan Workers' Party
 
 
 
 
 
  Revolutionary United Front

Former operators
  – never acquired to military service
  – never acquired to military service
  – never acquired to military service
 
  – 100 bought in the 1980s, but never acquired to military service.

Comparison chart

See also
 List of Russian weaponry

Citations

General and cited references

External links
 

KB Mashinostroyeniya products
Military equipment introduced in the 1970s
9K34
9K34